The 2017–18 Auburn Tigers men's basketball team represented Auburn University during the 2017–18 NCAA Division I men's basketball season as a member of the Southeastern Conference. The team's head coach was Bruce Pearl in his fourth season at Auburn. The team played their home games at the Auburn Arena in Auburn, Alabama. They finished the season 26–8, 13–5 in SEC play to win a share of the SEC regular season championship. They lost to Alabama in the quarterfinals of the SEC tournament. They received an at-large bid to the NCAA tournament where they defeated College of Charleston to advance to the Second Round where they lost to Clemson.

Previous season 
The Tigers finished the 2016–17 season 18–14, 7–11 in SEC play to finish in 11th place. They lost in the first round of the SEC tournament to Missouri.

FBI investigation

On September 26, 2017, federal prosecutors in New York announced charges of fraud and corruption against 10 people involved in college basketball, including Auburn associate head coach Chuck Person. The charges allege that Person and others allegedly received benefits from financial advisers and others to influence student-athletes to retain their services. Shortly thereafter, the school suspended Person without pay. Person was indicted by a federal grand jury and subsequently fired by Auburn on November 7, 2017.

Before Auburn's exhibition game on November 2, 2017, the school announced that it would hold players Austin Wiley and Danjel Purifoy out of games indefinitely due to eligibility concerns raised over the FBI investigation. On January 12, 2018, the NCAA ruled that Wiley would regain his eligibility in the 2018–19 season, ruling him ineligible for the remainder of the 2017–18 season.

Offseason

Departures

Incoming transfers

2017 recruiting class

Roster

Schedule and results

|-
!colspan=9 style=| Exhibition

|-
!colspan=9 style=| Non-conference regular season

|-
!colspan=9 style=| SEC regular season

|-
!colspan=9 style=| SEC Tournament

|-
!colspan=9 style=| NCAA tournament

Rankings

*AP does not release post-NCAA tournament rankings

References

Auburn Tigers men's basketball seasons
Auburn
Auburn
Auburn
Auburn